Kevin Blythe Sampson (born 1954) is an American artist and retired police officer living in Newark, New Jersey. He makes sculptures from discarded found objects that act as memorials for various people who have died. He has a studio based out of Newark.

Early life and education 
Sampson was born in 1954 in Elizabeth, New Jersey. Following high school and a few years of college, Sampson became a police officer and then a detective with the Scotch Plains Police Department in New Jersey. During his career as a police officer, Sampson worked as a composite sketch artist for the Scotch Plains Police Department, the first African American uniformed police composite sketch artist in the country.

Sampson moved to Newark in 1993 where he attended the Newark School of Fine and Industrial Arts. He began focusing on his art full-time following the deaths of close family members and his retirement from the Scotch Plains Police Department.

Career 
Sampson has been a gallery artist with Cavin-Morris Gallery in New York since 1992. Sampson makes sculptures from found objects, such as glass cabinet knobs, sticks, strings, screws, and wood chips. These sculptures act as altars, memorials, and spiritual objects. Sampson's work has been influenced by other New York artists who honor the dead through vernacular memorials. His work differs from these artists, as most create murals in Latin American neighborhoods and these street-side, altar-like assemblages of objects are meant to last through only a brief public-display period of remembrance and grief.

Sampson began making art as a means to heal after the death of several family members and as a new way to give back to his community. In the early 1990s, Sampson's wife, Pamela, was diagnosed with a terminal illness and their son, Kyle, was born prematurely and died. Sampson's work references and incorporates African spiritual traditions, including Yoruba, and follows the traditions of the Griot or storyteller. Much of Sampson's work offers commentary on issues of race, racism, and various forms of systemic injustice in the United States. Alongside other Newark-based artists, Sampson has spoken out against the recent, ongoing gentrification taking place in Newark, NJ.

Sampson has completed a number of residencies throughout the United States, including The Marie Walsh Sharp Space program in New York City; a teaching residency at the John Michael Kohler Art Center in Sheboygan, Wisconsin; the Joan Mitchell Center's residency in New Orleans; the Art and Industry Residency at the Kohler in Wisconsin; and  the Inaugural Residency at the Mystic Seaport Museum in Connecticut. 2019 participation at the  International Society of Biourbanism, summer School, Artena (Rome) Italy as a speaker, 2020 Residency in Martha's Vineyard in Union Chapel, in conjunction with the Mariposa Museum, sponsored by the Vineyard Trust

Television appearance
Sampson was turned into a cartoon, appearing as himself in the PBS Kids animated series Arthur, helping George with a school art project. Kevin's actual artwork is featured in the episode "George Scraps His Sculpture."

Selected exhibitions 

2020 CROSSROADS: Artists of the Black Pan-American Home ground American Perspectives: Stories from the American Folk Art Museum Collection
2020 Carnegie Museum, Installation Legend Of flying Africans, Martha’s Vineyard
2020 Mariposa Museum Installation “Legend of flying Africans” Martha’s Vineyard
2020 Mariposa Museum Installation “Legend of flying Africans” Martha’s Vineyard
2019 Artena Italy (Rome) Created site specific found object sculpture for the town
2019 Black and Blue New Jersey Center for Visual Arts
2019 Olde Soul, Rutgers university Paul Robeson gallery
2019 Mystic Seaport Museum “Monument Man’
2013 Installation “an Ill wind A blowing” City Without walls Newark, NJ  
2013 Installation the INTUIT - The Center for Intuitive and Outsider Art, Chicago “An Ill wind a blowing
 2012: Spirit—Fire—Shake! Focal objects by Renée Stout, Kevin Sampson and Odinga Tyehimba, Gregg Museum of Art & Design, North Carolina State University (Raleigh, NC)
 2013: Kevin Blythe Sampson: An Ill Wind Blowing, Intuit: The Center for Intuitive and Outsider Art (Chicago, IL)
 2014: The Roots of the Spirit: Lonnie Holley, Mr. Imagination, Charlie Lucas, Kevin Sampson, Weigand Gallery, Notre Dame de Namur University (Belmont, CA)
 2015: Anthems for the Mother Earth Goddess, Andrew Edlin Gallery (New York, NY)
 2016: Modern Heroics: 75 Years of African-American Expressionism, Newark Museum (Newark, NJ)

Awards 
 2020 Tree of life Artist Grant
2020 Joan Mitchell Artist Grant
 1Grants|website=joanmitchellfoundation.org|language=en|access-date=2017-03-11}}</ref>
 2016: Joan Mitchell Center, Artist-in-Residence (New Orleans, Louisiana)
 2017: John Michael Kohler Arts Center, Kohler Arts and Industry Residency (Kohler Village, Wisconsin)
994: Marie Walsh Sharpe Foundation, Artist-in-Residence (New York, New York)
 2001: Joan Mitchell Foundation, Painters & Sculptors Grant (New Orleans, Louisiana)<ref>{{Cite web|url=http://joanmitchellfoundation.org/artist-programs/artist-grants/painter-sculptors/2001/kevin-sampson|title=Joan Mitchell Foundation » Artist Programs » Artist

References

1954 births
Living people
Artists from Elizabeth, New Jersey
Artists from Newark, New Jersey
Sculptors from New Jersey
20th-century American sculptors
20th-century American male artists
21st-century American sculptors
21st-century American male artists
American male sculptors
American municipal police officers